The 2020 Qatar Open is the third event of the 2020 ITTF World Tour. It took place from 3–8 March in Doha, Qatar.

Men's singles

Seeds 

 Fan Zhendong (champion)
 Xu Xin (semifinals)
 Ma Long (second round)
 Lin Gaoyuan (first round)
 Tomokazu Harimoto (first round)
 Hugo Calderano (second round)
 Mattias Falck (second round)
 Liang Jingkun (quarterfinals)
 Wang Chuqin (semifinals)
 Patrick Franziska (first round)
 Koki Niwa (second round)
 Jun Mizutani (second round)
 Wong Chun Ting (first round)
 Simon Gauzy (quarterfinals)
 Liam Pitchford (final)
 Ahmad Khalil Al-Mohannadi (first round)

Top half

Bottom half

Finals

Women's singles

Seeds 

 Chen Meng (champion)
 Sun Yingsha (second round)
 Mima Ito (final)
 Wang Manyu (semifinals)
 Zhu Yuling (quarterfinals)
 Ding Ning (semifinals)
 Feng Tianwei (quarterfinals)
 Kasumi Ishikawa (second round)
 Miu Hirano (second round)
 Chen Xingtong (quarterfinals)
 Wang Yidi (quarterfinals)
 Sofia Polcanova (second round)
 Doo Hoi Kem (first round)
 Hitomi Sato (second round)
 He Zhuojia (first round)
 Maha Faramarzi (first round)

Top half

Bottom half

Finals

Men's doubles

Seeds 

 Ma Long / Xu Xin (champions)
 Ho Kwan Kit / Wong Chun Ting (semifinals)
 Fan Zhendong / Wang Chuqin (semifinals)
 Jakub Dyjas /  Cedric Nuytinck (first round)
 Martin Allegro / Florent Lambiet (first round)
 Shunsuke Togami / Yukiya Uda (quarterfinals)
 Tristan Flore / Emmanuel Lebesson (quarterfinals)
 Mohammed Abdulwahhab / Ahmad Khalil Al-Mohannadi (first round)

Draw

Women's doubles

Seeds 

 Miyuu Kihara / Miyu Nagasaki (final)
 Wang Manyu / Zhu Yuling (champions)
 Chen Meng / Ding Ning (quarterfinals)
 Miu Hirano / Kasumi Ishikawa (semifinals)
 Doo Hoi Kem / Lee Ho Ching (first round)
 Barbora Balážová /  Hana Matelová (quarterfinals)
 Natalia Bajor / Natalia Partyka (first round)
 Maha Faramarzi / Kholoud Hussain (first round)

Draw

Mixed doubles

Seeds 

 Jun Mizutani / Mima Ito (champions)
 Wong Chun Ting / Doo Hoi Kem (first round)
 Ľubomír Pištej / Barbora Balážová (first round)
 Ho Kwan Kit / Lee Ho Ching (semifinals)
 Stefan Fegerl / Sofia Polcanova (quarterfinals)
 Patrick Franziska / Petrissa Solja (first round)
 Tristan Flore / Laura Gasnier (first round)
 Mohammed Abdulwahhab / Maha Faramarzi (first round)

Draw

References 

Qatar Open
2020 in Qatari sport
Table tennis competitions in Qatar
Qatar Open